Claudette Buttigieg (née Pace, 8 February 1968) is a Maltese member of parliament, Deputy Speaker, and former TV presenter and singer.

Personal life and Eurovision Song Contest
Born in Naxxar, she won the Malta Song For Europe festival in January 2000, with the song Desire The song is her debut and only single. She toured Germany, Australia and Sweden, the host nation of the Eurovision Song Contest 2000 before the main event where her entry Desire finished in eighth place. The song was subsequently chosen as the official song for UK's 2001 gay pride. She was the only television presenter that worked with the main three Maltese television networks, being One TV, NET TV and TVM. She was acquitted from continuing her career as presenter on National TV (TVM) due to her entering politics.

Political career
She was elected in the Maltese parliament in 2013 from the 8th district as a member of the Nationalist Party and was a shadow minister for health.

She was re-elected in the 2017 general election and appointed Deputy Speaker. She was also re-elected in the 2022 Maltese general election.

Discography

Singles

References

External links
Listen to the song Desire
L-Isfida Official Website

1968 births
Living people
Eurovision Song Contest entrants of 2000
Eurovision Song Contest entrants for Malta
20th-century Maltese women singers
20th-century Maltese singers
Maltese television presenters
Nationalist Party (Malta) politicians
People from Naxxar
Maltese women television presenters
21st-century Maltese women politicians
21st-century Maltese politicians